Dávid Hudák (born 21 March 1993) is a Slovak football defender who currently plays for Gyirmót FC Győr. He is ethnic Hungarian.

ŠK Slovan Bratislava
He made his debut for ŠK Slovan Bratislava against MFK Košice on 22 July 2012.

Club statistics

Updated to games played as of 15 May 2022.

External links
 Slovan Bratislava profile

References

1993 births
Living people
Footballers from Bratislava
Slovak footballers
Association football defenders
ŠK Slovan Bratislava players
FC DAC 1904 Dunajská Streda players
MFK Skalica players
Újpest FC players
Mezőkövesdi SE footballers
Gyirmót FC Győr players
Slovak Super Liga players
2. Liga (Slovakia) players
Nemzeti Bajnokság I players
Nemzeti Bajnokság II players
Slovak expatriate footballers
Expatriate footballers in Hungary
Slovak expatriate sportspeople in Hungary